Corinne Schmidhauser (born 30 May 1964) is a Swiss former alpine skier. In 1987, she won the World Cup in slalom.  She also competed in the alpine skiing at the 1988 Winter Olympics.

Career
During her career she has achieved 8 results among the top 3 in the World Cup.

World Cup results
Top 3

References

External links
 
 

1964 births
Living people
Swiss female alpine skiers
Alpine skiers at the 1988 Winter Olympics
FIS Alpine Ski World Cup champions
Universiade medalists in alpine skiing
Universiade gold medalists for Switzerland
Competitors at the 1991 Winter Universiade
20th-century Swiss women